Coal Hollow may refer to:

Coal Hollow, Illinois, a community in Bureau County
Coal Hollow, Pennsylvania, a community in Elk County